Chah Piruzi (also Romanized as Chāh Pīrūzi) is a village in Golestan Rural District, in the Central District of Sirjan County, Kerman Province, Iran. At the 2006 census, its population was 30, in 10 families.

References 

Populated places in Sirjan County